Kamiyama Mitsunoshin (上山 満之進, 31 October 1869 – 30 July 1938) was the 11th Governor-General of Taiwan (1926–1928). He was Governor of Kumamoto Prefecture (1912–1913).

References

1869 births
1938 deaths
People from Yamaguchi Prefecture
Governors of Kumamoto Prefecture
Governors-General of Taiwan